The recorded history of Cape Verde begins with the Portuguese discovery of the island in 1456. Possible early references to Cape Verde date back at least 2000 years.

Prehistory

	
Cape Verde's first seamount rose above the water about 20 million years ago, and the sea level was about 200 to 400 meters higher than it is today. The first islands formed were present-day Sal and its eastern neighbors, around 40-50 million years ago. The western islands were formed later, including São Nicolau, as early as 11.8 million years ago, São Vicente, 9 million years ago, present-day Santiago and Fogo 4 million years ago, and Brava, 2-3 million years ago.

Some millions of years after the seamounts were raised above the Atlantic, the first lizards, insects, and plants came to the archipelago, possibly through ocean currents from the African mainland when the salinity of the ocean was lower.

The archipelago underwent several large volcanic eruptions recorded through geology, including Praia Grande 4.5 million years ago, São Vicente and possibly modern-day Porto Grande 300,000 years ago, Topo da Coroa 200,000 years ago and the last one east of modern-day Fogo 73,000 years ago that inundated coastal Santiago Island and possibly Brava and a part of Barlavento Islands.

During the Last Ice Age, the sea level dropped to about 130 meters below its current level. Cape Verde's islands were slightly larger, to the point of there being one large island called Northwest Island. Santo Antão was a kilometer northwest of the island, Boa Vista and Maio were one single island, and there was another island named Nola (Ilha da Nola) northwest of Santo Antão that was about 80–90 metres above sea level. Before the end of the Ice Age, the Eastern Island (Ilha Occidental) split into three islands, one became submerged and is now the João Valente Reef, the Canal de São Vicente was widened to provide 12 km separation from Santo Antão, Nola Island was submerged and again became a seamount, and the eastern parts of the Northwest Island were broken up into São Vicente, the smaller Santa Luzia, and the two islets of Branco and Raso.

Possible classical references 
Cape Verde may have been referred to in the works De choreographia by Pomponius Mela and Historia naturalis by Pliny the Elder. The writers called the islands "Gorgades", in reference to the home of the mythical Gorgons killed by Perseus. They also suggested (in typical ancient euhemerism) the islands as the place where the Carthaginian Hanno the Navigator slew two female "Gorillai", whose skins Hanno brought back to Carthage.
	
Pliny, citing the Greek writer Xenophon of Lampsacus, placed the Gorgades at two days' travel from "Hesperu Ceras" (the westernmost part of the African continent, today called Cap-Vert). Pliny (as quoted by Gaius Julius Solinus) also stated that the voyage from the Gorgades to the Hesperides took around 40 days.

The Isles of the Blessed written of by Marinus of Tyre and referenced by Ptolemy in his Geographia may have been the Cape Verde islands.

Portuguese discovery and colonisation

15th and 16th century 
In 1456, at the service of prince Henry the Navigator, Alvise Cadamosto, Antoniotto Usodimare (a Venetian and a Genoese captain, respectively) and an unnamed Portuguese captain, jointly discovered some of the islands. In the next decade, Diogo Gomes and António de Noli, also captains in the service of prince Henry, discovered the remaining islands of the archipelago. When these mariners first landed in Cape Verde, the islands were barren of people but not of vegetation. The Portuguese returned six years later to the island of São Tiago to establish Ribeira Grande (now Cidade Velha), in 1462—the first permanent European settlement city in the tropics.

In Spain, the Reconquista was growing in its mission to conquer Iberia and later expel the Muslims and Jews. In 1492 the Spanish Inquisition also emerged in its fullest expression of anti-Semitism. It spread to neighboring Portugal (as the Portuguese Inquisition) where King João II and especially Manuel I in 1496, decided to exile thousands of Jews to São Tomé, Príncipe, and Cape Verde.

The Portuguese soon brought slaves from the West African coast. Positioned on the great trade routes between Africa, Europe, and the New World, the archipelago prospered from the transatlantic slave trade, in the 16th century. Settlements started to appear on other islands, São Filipe was founded in 1500, Ponta do Sol, Ribeira Grande was founded in the mid 16th century, its first settlers also arrived in Madeira, Ribeira Brava on São Nicolau, Povoação Velha on Boa Vista was later founded, Furna, Nova Sintra on Brava and Palmeira on Sal.

The islands' prosperity brought them unwanted attention in the form of sacking at the hands of pirates. 
After the Philippine Dynasty began, Sir Francis Drake first sacked Ribeira Grande in 1582 and then captured the island in 1585 and raided Cidade Velha, Praia and São Domingos, soon after they left.  A year later in 1586, Cape Verde became a unified crown colony of Portugal.

17th and 18th century 

The city Praia was founded in 1613 on the plateau of the previous settlement. In 1680 Pico do Fogo erupted, which resulted in the move of the population to Brava and other parts including Brazil. For a few years, the volcano was a natural lighthouse that sailors used.
During the 17th century, Algerian corsairs established a base in the Cape Verde islands. In 1617 they raided Madeira, stealing the church bells and taking 1,200 people captive. As a result of the French Cassard expedition in 1712 in which Ribeira Grande was destroyed, the capital was partly moved to Praia in the east, which later became the capital in 1770. By 1740, the island was a supply point for American slave ships and whalers. This started a stream of immigration to the American colonies (now the United States), but only of men.

In 1747 the islands were hit with the first of several droughts and famines that have plagued them ever since, with an average interval of five years. The situation was made worse by deforestation and overgrazing, which destroyed the ground vegetation that provided moisture. Three major droughts in the 18th and 19th centuries resulted in well over 100,000 people starving to death. The Portuguese government sent almost no relief during any of the droughts.

Given the scarcity of capital for the region's development, the Portuguese Finance and Overseas Councils authorized the foundation of the Guinea Coast Company (1664), aimed at the slave trade, putting an end to the period of individual tenants and opening that of slave companies. Among these, there is the Company of Cacheu and Rivers and Commerce of Guinea, which operated between 1676 and 1682, being succeeded, in 1690, by the Company of Cacheu and Cape Verde.

Textiles were smuggled and sold in the black market since their values were high and their origins were difficult to prove, between 1766 and 1776, 95,000 "barafulas" (Cape Verdean textiles) were imported to the Guinean coast.

Pico do Fogo again erupted in 1769. This was the last time it erupted from the top; further eruptions occurred in 1785 and 1799.  Another famine started in 1774 in which 20,000 people starved, as Brava and Fogo were affected. Fogo's population dropped from 5,700 to 4,200 in around 1777. The first wave of emigration began from the islands of Brava and Fogo as American whaling ships visited these islands and took some residents for a better life in the United States.  In 1770, Praia became the colonial capital, and so remained up to Cape Verdean independence.

Though Portugal was neutral throughout the Anglo-French War and American Revolutionary War, British and French squadrons fought the Battle of Porto Praya off modern-day Praia on 16 April 1781.

19th century 

The 19th-century decline of the lucrative slave trade was another blow to the country's economy. The fragile prosperity slowly vanished. Cape Verde's colonial heyday was over.
It was around this time that Cape Verdeans started emigrating to New England. This was a popular destination because of the whales that abounded in the waters around Cape Verde, and as early as 1810 whaling ships from Massachusetts and Rhode Island in the United States (U.S.) recruited crews from the islands of Brava and Fogo.

The last pirate raids, including one in Sal Rei in 1815, led to the building of a couple of more forts across Cape Verde. Other settlements on some islands were founded later including Mindelo (first as Nossa Senhora da Luz) in 1795, Pedra de Lume on Sal in 1799, and Santa Maria at the start of 1830 on the same island.  The colonial capital Praia underwent modernization in 1822 which expanded the plateau towards the north.

After Portugal lost Brazil, the British used Mindelo for coal refueling for ships and the city flourished in 1838. An attempt to move the colonial capital from Praia was made, first a plan to move to Picos in 1831 at the time another famine struck Cape Verde, then in 1838, Mindelo was decided on. Many people did not want to move the colonial capital, thus the capital stayed in Praia. Fogo erupted for the last few times in the 19th century in 1847, 1852, and 1857.  Mindelo grew as a result of ship refueling, two submarine telegraph cables were linked in 1874 to Pernambuco, Brazil, as well as Cory Brothers later opened, another connected to Cameroon via Bathurst (now Banjul), the Gambia in 1885. Mindelo became the most used Transatlantic telegraph station for some time in 1912.  A total of 669 ships were refueled each year at the port, and it reached 1,927 ships a decade later. Then when gasoline fuel was starting to be used especially on boats, Mindelo could never rival the ports of Las Palmas on Grand Canary or nearby Dakar in Senegal. The use of coal declined, leading to a coal strike in 1912 due to insufficient work, when the Great Depression began in 1930, ship activity ended.

Slavery disappeared in Cape Verde, first in São Vicente, then São Nicolau, Santo Antão, and Boa Vista in 1867, the same time the slave trade ended in Portugal. Slavery later ended throughout Cape Verde.

20th century 

At the end of the 19th century, with the advent of the ocean liner, the island's position astride Atlantic shipping lanes made Cape Verde an ideal location for resupplying ships with fuel (imported coal), water, and other supplies. Because of its excellent harbour, Mindelo (on the island of São Vicente) became an important commercial centre during the 19th century, mainly because British companies used Cape Verde as a storage depot for coal which was bound for the Americas. The harbour area at Mindelo was developed by British merchants for this purpose. The island was transformed into a coaling and submarine cable station, and there soon became plenty of work available for local labourers. This was the golden period of the city, where it gained the cultural characteristics that made it the current cultural capital of the country.

During World War II, Royal Navy ships were stationed in Mindelo, later with Winston Churchill's interest in Cape Verde, in April 1941, thousands of Allied troops were stationed on the island. After the Second World War, the economy collapsed as the shipping traffic was drastically reduced. As the British coal industry went into decline in the 1980s, this source of income dried up, and British merchants had to abandon their Cape Verdean interests — which ended up being the final strike to the highly dependent local economy.
 
Espargos in the middle of the island of Sal was founded in the late 1940s as an airport town, the last in the Portuguese era. From 1950 to 1970, the number of flights rose. Espargos became an important stop for Alitalia, then the Portuguese-Brazilian Friendship flight, and then South African Airways (SAA) in 1967 with flights between London and Johannesburg. The airline had to use the airport due to the international boycott of apartheid at the time. The last eruption in the colonial era was at Pico do Fogo in 1951 and was a small one.

In 1952, the Portuguese government planned to transfer over 10,000 settlers to the island of São Tomé in São Tomé and Príncipe, another Portuguese colony, to work in plantations instead of the Forros.  Africans would come mainly from the islands of São Nicolau, Santiago, Santo Antão, Fogo, and Brava.  During the time that the two colonies became independent, many left for Europe and the United States, and a few returned to Cape Verde. The Cape Verdean population was moved to the nearby island of Príncipe, and many Cape Verdean descendants, some with another descendant were incorporated into the Príncipe Creole society.

During this period, several famines occurred in the country, worsened by poor harvests, the Second World War, and a poor response from the Portuguese colonial administration. These famines led to the emigration of tens of thousands to Europe, some left to Senegal and São Tomé and Príncipe.

In the lead-up to and during the Portuguese Colonial War, those planning and fighting in the armed conflict in Portuguese Guinea often linked the goal of liberation of Guinea-Bissau to the goal of liberation in Cape Verde. (For instance, in 1956, Amílcar and Luís Cabral founded the African Party for the Independence of Guinea and Cape Verde.)

Independence movement 

Although the Cape Verdeans were treated badly by their colonial masters, Portuguese treatment of Cape Verdeans was distinct from their treatment of other colonized regions, and the people of Cape Verde fared slightly better than Africans in other Portuguese colonies because of their lighter skin. A small minority received an education and Cape Verde was the first African-Portuguese colony to have a school for higher education. By the time of independence, a quarter of the population could read, compared to 5% in Portuguese Guinea (now Guinea-Bissau).

This largesse ultimately backfired on the Portuguese, however, as literate Cape Verdeans became aware of the pressures for independence building on the mainland, while the islands continued suffering from frequent drought and famine, at times from epidemic diseases and volcanic eruptions, and the Portuguese government did nothing. Thousands of people died of starvation during the first half of the 20th century. Although the nationalist movement appeared less fervent in Cape Verde than in Portugal's other African holdings, the African Party for the Independence of Guinea and Cape Verde (PAIGC, an acronym for the Portuguese Partido Africano da Independência da Guiné e Cabo Verde) was founded in 1956 by Amílcar Cabral and other pan-Africanists, and many Cape Verdeans fought for independence in Guinea-Bissau.

In 1926 Portugal had become a rightist dictatorship that regarded the colonies as an economic frontier, to be developed in the interest of Portugal and the Portuguese. Frequent famine, unemployment, poverty, and the failure of the Portuguese government to address these issues caused resentment. The Portuguese dictator António de Oliveira Salazar wasn't about to give up his colonies as easily as other European colonial powers had given up theirs.

After World War II, Portugal was intent to hold on to its former colonies, called overseas territories since 1951. When most former African colonies gained independence in 1957/1964, the Portuguese still held on. Consequently, following the Pijiguiti Massacre, the people of Cape Verde and Guinea-Bissau fought one of the longest African liberation wars.

As with other colonies in 1972, autonomy was granted and Portuguese Cape Verde held its only parliamentary elections in 1973, in which only Portuguese citizens could vote. Out of a total population of 272,071, only 25,521 people registered to vote. A total of 20,942 people voted. As the Portuguese constitution banned political parties at the time, the majority of candidates were put forward by the ruling People's National Action movement, although some civic associations were allowed to nominate candidates.

After the Carnation Revolution on 25 April 1974, Cape Verde became more autonomous but continued to have an overseas governor until that post became High Commissioner. Widespread unrest forced the government to negotiate with the PAIGC, and agreements for an independent Cape Verde were on the table.  Pedro Pires returned to Praia on 13 October after being exiled for over a decade. After his return, Portugal signed the 1975 Algiers Agreement. On 5 July at Praia, Portuguese Prime Minister Vasco Gonçalves turned over power to National Assembly President Abilio Duarte. The colonial history of Cape Verde ended when Cape Verde become independent. However, there was no armed conflict in Cape Verde and ultimately independence for Cape Verde resulted from negotiation with Portugal. The catalyst for the independence of Cape Verde was the PAIGC branch in Guinea-Bissau, which launched an ultimately successful war against the Portuguese in Guinea-Bissau, who eventually compelled Portugal to accept independence for Cape Verde.

Post-Independence (1975)

One-party rule 
Immediately following a November 1980 coup in Guinea-Bissau (Portuguese Guinea declared independence in 1973 and was granted de jure independence in 1974), relations between the two countries became strained. Cape Verde abandoned its hope for unity with Guinea-Bissau and formed the African Party for the Independence of Cape Verde (PAICV). Problems have since been resolved, and relations between the countries are good. The PAICV and its predecessor established a one-party state and ruled Cape Verde from independence until 1990.

Responding to growing pressure for a political opening, the PAICV called an emergency congress in February 1990 to discuss proposed constitutional changes to end one-party rule. Opposition groups came together to form the Movement for Democracy (MpD) in Praia in April 1990. Together, they campaigned for the right to contest the presidential election scheduled for December 1990. The one-party state was abolished on 28 September 1990, and the first multi-party elections were held in January 1991.

Post-one-party rule 
The MpD won a majority of the seats in the National Assembly, and the MpD presidential candidate António Mascarenhas Monteiro defeated the PAICV's candidate by 73.5% of the votes cast to 26.5%. He succeeded the country's first President, Aristides Pereira, who had served since 1975.

Legislative elections in December 1995 increased the MpD majority in the National Assembly. The party held 50 of the National Assembly's 72 seats. A February 1996 presidential election returned President António Mascarenhas Monteiro to office. The December 1995 and February 1996 elections were judged free and fair by domestic and international observers.

In the presidential election campaign of 2000 and 2001, two former prime ministers, Pedro Pires and Carlos Veiga were the main candidates. Pires was the prime minister during the PAICV regime, while Veiga served as prime minister during most of Monteiro's presidency, stepping aside only when it came time for campaigning. In what might have been one of the closest races in electoral history, Pires won by 12 votes, he and Veiga each receiving nearly half the votes. President Pedro Pires was narrowly re-elected in 2006 elections.

Jorge Carlos Almeida Fonseca was the President of Cape Verde since 2011 elections and he was re-elected in October 2016. President Fonseca was supported by the Movement for Democracy (MpD). MpD leader Ulisses Correia e Silva has been prime minister since the 2016 elections when his party ousted the ruling African Party for the Independence of Cape Verde (PAICV) for the first time in 15 years.

In October 2021, opposition candidate and former prime minister, Jose Maria Neves of PAICV, won Cape Verde's presidential election. On 9 November 2021, Neves was sworn in as the new president of Cape Verde.

See also
History of Africa
History of Guinea-Bissau
History of West Africa
List of heads of government of Cape Verde
List of heads of state of Cape Verde
Politics of Cape Verde

Footnotes

External links 

Cape Verde Historical Timeline by Raymond Almeida. alternative site